John "Pete" Perry (born March 24, 1948) is a former American basketball center. He played college basketball at Pan American College.

Early years
Perry enrolled at Utica Junior College. He transferred to Pan American College at the end of his sophomore season.

As a junior, he set a school single-season record with 96 total blocks. He also established a school single-game record with 8 blocked shots against the University of Southern Mississippi, which he later broke with 11 blocks against Lamar University (2/21/72). He made 9 blocks against Tennessee Tech University. He had 7 blocked shots both against Southwestern University and Lamar University (2/8/72).

As a senior, he played in 26 games, averaging 20.1 points, 14.9 rebounds (seventh in school history), for a single-season total of 388 rebounds (seventh in school history) and a total of 120 blocked shots (school record).

Perry was a prolific shot blocker while playing for the Broncs and set the program record for most career blocks with 216, which is over double that of the second highest player. He also left school ranking seventh in career rebounds with 670.

Professional career
Perry was selected by the Los Angeles Lakers in the second round (34th overall) of the 1973 NBA draft. He was also selected by the Virginia Squires in the 1973 ABA draft. He was released before the start of the season.

In September 1974, he signed as a free agent with the New York Knicks. In October, he was released before the start of the season after the re-signing of Tom Riker. Perry never played in the National Basketball Association (NBA).

References

External links
College statistics

1948 births
Living people
African-American basketball players
American men's basketball players
Basketball players from Mississippi
Centers (basketball)
Hinds Community College alumni
Junior college men's basketball players in the United States
Los Angeles Lakers draft picks
People from Utica, Mississippi
Texas–Pan American Broncs men's basketball players
21st-century African-American people
20th-century African-American sportspeople